Events from the year 1943 in Canada.

Incumbents

Crown 
 Monarch – George VI

Federal government 
 Governor General – Alexander Cambridge, 1st Earl of Athlone
 Prime Minister – William Lyon Mackenzie King
 Chief Justice – Lyman Poore Duff (British Columbia)
 Parliament – 19th

Provincial governments

Lieutenant governors 
Lieutenant Governor of Alberta – John C. Bowen   
Lieutenant Governor of British Columbia – William Culham Woodward 
Lieutenant Governor of Manitoba – Roland Fairbairn McWilliams  
Lieutenant Governor of New Brunswick – William George Clark  
Lieutenant Governor of Nova Scotia – Henry Ernest Kendall 
Lieutenant Governor of Ontario – Albert Edward Matthews 
Lieutenant Governor of Prince Edward Island – Bradford William LePage 
Lieutenant Governor of Quebec – Eugène Fiset 
Lieutenant Governor of Saskatchewan – Archibald Peter McNab

Premiers 
Premier of Alberta – William Aberhart (until May 23) then Ernest Manning (from May 31)  
Premier of British Columbia – John Hart  
Premier of Manitoba – John Bracken (until January 14) then Stuart Garson  
Premier of New Brunswick – John McNair 
Premier of Nova Scotia – A.S. MacMillan
Premier of Ontario – Gordon Daniel Conant (until May 18) then Harry Nixon (May 18 to August 17) then George A. Drew 
Premier of Prince Edward Island – Thane Campbell (until May 11) then J. Walter Jones  
Premier of Quebec – Adélard Godbout 
Premier of Saskatchewan – William John Patterson

Territorial governments

Commissioners 
 Controller of Yukon – George A. Jeckell 
 Commissioner of Northwest Territories – Charles Camsell

Events
January 8 – Stuart Garson becomes premier of Manitoba, replacing John Bracken, who had governed for 21 years
May 11 – J. Walter Jones becomes premier of Prince Edward Island, replacing Thane Campbell
May 18 – Harry Nixon becomes premier of Ontario, replacing Gordon Conant
May 23 – William Aberhart, premier of Alberta, dies in office
May 31 – Ernest Manning becomes premier of Alberta
July – The 1st Canadian Infantry Division is part of the invasion of Sicily.
August 4 – Ontario election: George Drew's PCs win a minority, defeating Harry Nixon's Liberals 
August 17 – George Drew becomes premier of Ontario, replacing Harry Nixon
August 19 – The Quebec Agreement is signed in Quebec City, between Canada, the United Kingdom and the United States.
October 22 – The crew of  set up Weather Station Kurt near Martin Bay in Labrador
December 20 – December 27 – Battle of Ortona rages in Italy.

Sport 
April 28 – The Manitoba Junior Hockey League's Winnipeg Rangers win their second Memorial Cup by defeating the Ontario Hockey Association's Oshawa Generals  4 games to 2. The deciding Game 6 was played at Maple Leaf Gardens in Toronto
November 27 – The Hamilton Flying Wildcats win their only Grey Cup by defeating the Winnipeg RCAF Bombers 23 to 14 in the 31st Grey Cup played at Varsity Stadium in Toronto

Births

January to March
January 9 - Elmer MacFadyen, politician (d. 2007)
January 10 - Carl Ray, artist (d. 1978)
January 23 - Bill Cameron, news anchor, television producer, columnist and author (d. 2005)
January 28 - Paul Henderson, ice hockey player
February 19 - Art Hanger, politician
February 23 - Charles Dalfen, chairperson of the Canadian Radio-television and Telecommunications Commission (d. 2009)
February 27 - Gordon Earle, politician
March 11 - Bob Plager, ice hockey player (d. 2021)
March 15 - David Cronenberg, filmmaker, screenwriter and occasional actor
March 25 - Loyola Hearn, politician and Minister

April to June

April 1 - Shirley Render, politician
April 2 - Alan Tonks, politician
April 3 - Richard Manuel, composer, singer and multi-instrumentalist (d. 1986)
April 12 - Jenny Meldrum, hurdler and heptathlete
April 17 - Bobby Curtola, singer  (d. 2016)
April 22 - Edwin Tchorzewski, politician (d. 2008)
May 11 - Nancy Greene Raine, alpine skier, Olympic gold medallist and World Champion, Senator
June 5 - Jean-Claude Lord, film director and screenwriter (d. 2022)
June 21 - Diane Marleau, politician and Minister (d. 2013)

July to September

July 15 - John H. Bryden, politician, journalist and historian
July 30 - Jean Friesen, politician
July 31 - Ryan Larkin, animator, artist and sculptor (d. 2007)
August 9 - Joe Handley, politician and 10th Premier of the Northwest Territories
August 12 - Anne Cools, Senator
August 29 - Arthur B. McDonald, astrophysicist, Nobel Prize in Physics winner
September 9 - Daurene Lewis, politician and nation's first black female mayor (d. 2013)
September 12 - Alain Dostie, cinematographer, film director and screenwriter
September 12 - Michael Ondaatje, novelist and poet
September 19 - Lyle Vanclief, politician and Minister
September 22 - Maurice Baril, General and Chief of the Defence Staff
September 27 - Randy Bachman, guitarist and songwriter

October to December

October 16 - Paul Rose, convicted of murder and kidnapping of Pierre Laporte in 1970 and leader of PDS (1996–2002) (d. 2013)
October 24 - Frank Pitura, politician (d. 2019)
October 26 - Diane Gerace, high jumper 
November 7 - Joni Mitchell, musician, songwriter and painter
November 13 - André-Gilles Fortin, politician (d. 1977)
November 18 - Michael H. Rayner, public servant (d. 2004)
November 22 - Yvan Cournoyer, ice hockey player
November 27 - Nicole Brossard, poet and novelist
December 2 - Larry Grossman, politician (d. 1997)
December 13 - Ferguson Jenkins, baseball player
December 14 - Linda McIntosh, politician
December 21 - André Arthur, radio host and politician (d. 2022)
December 28 - David Peterson, politician and 20th Premier of Ontario 
December 29 - Rick Danko, musician and singer (d. 1999)
December 30 - Linda Thom, shooter and Olympic gold medallist

Deaths
February 9 - Albert Hickman, politician and 17th Prime Minister of Newfoundland (b. 1875)
May 23 - William Aberhart, politician and 8th Premier of Alberta (b. 1878)
July 2 - Robert James Manion, politician (b. 1881)
July 4 - Gordon Sidney Harrington, politician and Premier of Nova Scotia (b. 1883)
July 12 - Joseph Boutin Bourassa, politician (b. 1853)
October 18 - Albert Charles Saunders, jurist, politician and Premier of Prince Edward Island (b. 1874)
November 26 - Charles G.D. Roberts, poet and prose writer (b. 1860)
November 29 - Robert Hamilton Butts, politician (b. 1871)
December 9 - Peter Dmytruk, World War II military hero (b. 1920)
December 23 - Edgar Sydney Little, politician (b. 1885)

See also
 List of Canadian films

Historical documents
Slightly confused 1st Infantry Division invades Sicily against "bewildered" and "sorry looking" Italian defenders

Film: Canadian and U.S. troops train for Italian invasion

Film: Canadian soldiers and nurses embark for Italian invasion

Cartoon: Axis forces quickly retreating from "Sicilian landings"

Command crucial, but battles are won "by human beings displaying judgment, coolness and courage" (and in Sicily's "unending heat")

Seaforth Highlanders take Monte San Marco in Italy, despite steep, muddy terrain and intense German fire

Top German generals recognize disadvantages fighting Allies in Italy, including "Canadians clever at making use of terrain"

Canadian infantry and tanks press "a literally yard-by-yard advance" through Ortona streets, houses, and even rooms

Film: Canadian troops fighting in Ortona

Germans leave Ortona and their dead - "Civilians[...]too dazed to realize the enemy had gone; Canadians[...]too tired to care"

Guide for battlefield first aid emphasizes combat practicality, like common sense, self-reliance, improvisation, effective care and carrying on fight

Newspaper illustration of RCAF Spitfire planes strafing freight trains in Europe

Photo: Canadians in joint landing operation with U.S. forces against Japanese invaders on Kiska Island, Alaska

"The Jewish reservoir of the East, which was able to counterbalance the western assimilation, no longer exists"

At end of fourth year of war, Prime Minister King calls for greater effort and sacrifice to defeat faltering Axis

National registration certificate of Mrs. Ethel Louise Buck, Spirit River, Alberta

"We are few, very few" - Quebecker laments that there are not enough pacifists in province to even produce their newsletter

Advisory group chair foresees postwar period of more skilled labour, greater production, new products and technology, and huge demand

U.S.-U.K. agreement creates executive committee with Canadian representation to guide nuclear development

Canada wants multilateral general agreement to reduce tariffs, and to encourage U.S.A. and Canada to "buy in order to sell"

Report with proposed economic reforms for benefit of Prairie provinces, adjacent U.S.A., and world at large

Canada threatens to step back if not given more say in new UN Relief and Rehabilitation Organization

Lester Pearson complains to External Affairs about U.S. censorship of official's call from legation in Washington to Ottawa

Government returns about 15% of seized Japanese-Canadian fishing fleet to owners

"So reactionary to Liberal principles" - PM King depressed by cabinet's close-minded attitude to steelworker strike

Cartoon: Hitler says of strikers, "They are really working for me!"

Communist Tim Buck's submission on labour relations to National War Labor Board emphasizes wage policy and collective bargaining

Because of their difficulty finding housing and jobs, British Columbia MLA raises funds for halfway house for women discharged from mental institutions

As they fund-raise for bombers, London's Women's Voluntary Services thanks Manitobans for gifts of clothes and mobile canteens

"You can't refuse this cake, it was sent me all the way from Canada" - touring WVS speaker enjoys local hospitality

"Defend[ing] freedom and culture of humanity" - Shostakovich's thank-you for Toronto performance of his Seventh Symphony

Photo: RCAF member meets famed actor who plays "Rochester" on Jack Benny's radio comedy show

References

 
Years of the 20th century in Canada
Canada
1943 in North America
1940s in Canada